Ram Lakhan is a 1989 Indian Hindi-language masala film directed by Subhash Ghai and written by Anwar Khan with screenplay by Ram Kelkar. Ram Lakhan stars an ensemble cast of Raakhee, Jackie Shroff, Anil Kapoor, Dimple Kapadia, Madhuri Dixit and Amrish Puri in lead roles. The supporting cast includes Paresh Rawal, Anupam Kher, Gulshan Grover, Saeed Jaffrey and Satish Kaushik. Music of the film  was by Laxmikant–Pyarelal, while Anand Bakshi penned the lyrics. Ghai also did a special appearance in the song "Tera Naam Liya Tujhe Yaad Kiya".

Made on a budget of  including production and marketing costs, Ram Lakhan was released theatrically on 27 January 1989 on the Republic Day weekend. The film emerged as a major critical and commercial success and earned  worldwide, becoming the second highest grossing Bollywood film of 1989. Considered as Ghai's best work till date, Ram Lakhan has attained a cult classic status over the years and is still remembered for its cast, direction and soundtrack. Kapoor's performance as Lakhan was much loved and is regarded as one of his best roles; the song "My Name Is Lakhan" filmed on him has become his trademark and signature song. 

At the 35th Filmfare Awards, Ram Lakhan received 9 nominations, including Best Film, Best Director (Ghai) and Best Music Director (Laxmikant–Pyarelal), and won 2 awards – Best Supporting Actress (Raakhee) and Best Comedian (for both Kher and Kaushik).

Plot 
Sharda is happily married in a rich household to Thakur Pratap Singh and they have two young sons, Ram and Lakhan. Pratap's father Veer shows mercy to his nephews Bhishambar and Bhanu after they serve jail time for siphoning the family wealth. Veer is tricked into signing a will that deprives Pratap, Sharda, Ram and Lakhan from the ok wealth and right to even live in the manor's premises.

Veer is then killed in a car bomb. Pratap refuses to bow down to cruel Bhishambar after finding out their master plan; he is later severely beaten up, stabbed brutally and left on a nearby railway track to be cut to pieces by the next passing train, leaving behind Sharda, Ram and Lakhan. Sharda vows to avenge Pratap’s death and hopes will get it by visiting the temple every day, praying for justice. She talks about when her sons grow up and ultimately destroy Pratap’s assailants, and it is then and then only that she will disperse Pratap's ashes.

20 years later
Ram is now the police inspector, being the major obstacle in Bhishambar's illegal activities. He is also in love with Geeta, the daughter of commissioner Arun Kashyap. Lakhan is the fun-loving millionaire, precocious young man, still living in Ram's shadow and Sharda's love. When Lakhan finds out there is a big reward for the arrest of notorious gangster Kesariya Vilayti, he single-handedly captures him and claims the reward.

Thinking police work is quite easy, Lakhan applies for the job, begins training and eventually becomes an inspector also. He too seeks to use this to woo his childhood sweetheart Radha and deal with her stingy, eccentric but easily fooled father, Deodhar Shastri. Sharda heads to a religious pilgrimage. When she returns, she finds that Ram and Lakhan have quarreled and no longer speak with each other based on their ideological differences.

Lakhan uses his power to make extra money in an attempt to raise his clout so he can take revenge against Bhishambar and Bhanu. While Ram creates obstacles for Bhishambar, Lakhan joins his gang and is on their payroll. However, after he is tricked by Bhishamber and the ruthless, womanizing and dastardly Sir John, Ram has to come to terms and save him and finish what was once started.

Cast 

Jackie Shroff as Inspector Ram Pratap Singh: Sharda and Thakur Pratap’s elder son; Lakhan's elder brother; Geeta's lover
Anil Kapoor as Sub-Inspector Lakhan Pratap Singh: Sharda and Thakur Pratap’s younger son; Ram's younger brother; Radha's lover
Raakhee as Sharda Pratap Singh: Thakur Pratap’s wife; Ram and Lakhan's mother
Dimple Kapadia as Geeta Kashyap: Arun's daughter; Ram's lover
Madhuri Dixit as Radha Shastri: Deodhar's daughter; Lakhan's lover
Amrish Puri as Bhishambar Nath: Thakur Pratap’s cousin; Bhanu's elder brother; Nirmala's husband
Gulshan Grover as Kesariya Vilayati / Badman
Paresh Rawal as Bhanu Nath: Thakur Pratap’s cousin; Bhishambar's younger brother
Anupam Kher as Deodhar Shastri: Radha's father
Saeed Jaffrey as Arun Kashyap: Geeta's father
Raza Murad as Sir John
Dalip Tahil as Thakur Pratap Singh: Veer's son; Bhishambar and Bhanu's cousin; Sharda's husband; Ram and Lakhan's father
Annu Kapoor as Shivcharan Mathur
Anirudh Agarwal as Jeeva
Sonika Gill as Vivia
Anand Balraj as Debrath Nath / Debu
Mukri as Dhondu Nai
Lalita Kumari as Nirmala Bhishambar Nath: Bhishambar's wife
Subhash Ghai as Manmohan Mhatre (special appearance in song "Tera Naam Liya Tujhe Yaad Kiya")
Satish Kaushik as Kanshiram Dey
Lahiri Singh as Veer Pratap Singh: Thakur Pratap’s father; Sharda's father-in-law; Bhishambar and Bhanu's uncle; Ram and Lakhan's grandfather
Mukesh Rawal as Mukund Trivedi: Lakhan's friend

Track list 
The soundtrack was composed by Laxmikant–Pyarelal and the lyrics written by Anand Bakshi. The songs were extremely popular and remain popular even today. The cathy numbers like "My Name Is Lakhan" and "tera naam liya, tujhe yaad kiya" were playing almost in every street in Northern India, the album also includes melodious and soulful tracks like "O Ram ji! bada dukh deena" with mythological connotations and the title track "mere do Anmol Ratan" .

Awards 
35th Filmfare Awards:
Won

 Best Supporting Actress – Raakhee
Best Comedian – Anupam Kher and Satish Kaushik (tie)

Nominated

 Best Film – Ashok Ghai
Best Director – Subhash Ghai
Best Music Director – Laxmikant Pyarelal
Best Male Playback Singer – Mohammed Aziz – "My Name is Lakhan"
Best Female Playback Singer – Anuradha Paudwal for "Bekhabar Bewafa" 
Best Female Playback Singer – Anuradha Paudwal for "Tera Naam Liya"

References

External links 
 

1980s Hindi-language films
1980s masala films
1989 films
Fictional portrayals of the Maharashtra Police
Films directed by Subhash Ghai
Films scored by Laxmikant–Pyarelal